Betacoronavirus 1 is a species of coronavirus which infects humans and cattle. The infecting virus is an enveloped, positive-sense, single-stranded RNA virus and is a member of the genus Betacoronavirus and subgenus Embecovirus. Like other embecoviruses, it has an additional shorter spike-like surface protein called hemagglutinin esterase (HE) as well as the larger coronavirus spike protein.

References

Betacoronaviruses